Stélio Marcelino Ernesto, better known as Telinho (born 15 October 1988) is a Mozambican football winger who currently plays for Moçambola club UD Songo and the Mozambique national team.

He previously played for Liga Muçulmana, Ferroviário Pemba, Naval 1º de Maio in Portugal and Ajax Cape Town in South Africa.

Telinho won the Moçambola national title in 2011 and the Taça de Moçambique in 2012 while playing for Liga Muçulmana in Mozambique, making two appearances in the CAF Champions League while scoring once during his tenure with the club as well.

In 2014, Telinho returned to his former club Liga Muçulmana, following an unsuccessful trial with Portuguese Primeira Liga club C.D. Nacional.

International career

International goals
Scores and results list Mozambique's goal tally first.

Honours

Club
Liga Muçulmana
Moçambola: 2011
Taça de Moçambique: 2012

References

External links

1988 births
Living people
Cape Town Spurs F.C. players
Association football midfielders
Mozambican footballers
Mozambique international footballers
Mozambican expatriate footballers
Expatriate footballers in Portugal
Mozambican expatriate sportspeople in Portugal
Mozambican expatriate sportspeople in South Africa
Expatriate soccer players in South Africa
Liga Desportiva de Maputo players
Associação Naval 1º de Maio players
UD Songo players
Mozambique A' international footballers
2022 African Nations Championship players